The Sixth Street Viaduct, also known as the Sixth Street Bridge, is a viaduct bridge that connects the Arts District in Downtown Los Angeles with the Boyle Heights neighborhood. 

The Sixth Street Viaduct spans the Los Angeles River, the Santa Ana Freeway (US 101), and the Golden State Freeway (I-5), as well as Metrolink (Orange County and 91 lines), Amtrak (Pacific Surfliner and Southwest Chief), and Union Pacific (along with Metrolink's Riverside Line) railroad tracks and several local streets. The original, which opened in 1932 and demolished in 2016, was replaced; the replacement was officially opened in 2022.
 
The predecessor was composed of three independent structures: the reinforced concrete west segment, the central steel arch segment over the river, and the reinforced concrete east segment. In 1986, the Caltrans bridge survey found the Sixth Street Viaduct eligible for inclusion in the National Register of Historic Places.

The demolition of the predecessor bridge was due to serious structural issues, including several large cracks, resulting from the high alkaline content of the concrete composition, due to architectural unsophistication. As a result, concerns over the structure’s seismic instability outweighed its historical status, leading to its closure for demolition and replacement in January 2016. The new replacement bridge was completed six years later and opened on July 9, 2022.

Demolition and replacement

 

During the construction of the viaduct in the 1930s, an onsite plant was used to supply the concrete for construction. However, the quality of the concrete turned out to have a high alkali content and led to an alkali-silica reaction (ASR), which created cracks in the concrete and sapped the strength of the structure. It is the only one of the historic LA River bridges to suffer from ASR.

Estimates stated that the viaduct had a 70% probability of collapse due to a major earthquake within 50 years. After initial demolition plans were delayed, the bridge was closed on January 27, 2016, and demolition began on February 5, 2016. It took nine months to demolish the existing bridge.

Prior to the demolition, Los Angeles mayor Eric Garcetti recorded the R&B song "101SlowJam", backed by musicians from the city's Roosevelt High School, and issued it via a video on his own YouTube channel. The public service announcement video advertised the closure of parts of the 101 Freeway to accommodate the demolition of the viaduct. An estimated  of concrete, 1,245 tons of structural steel, and 4,200 tons of rebar were hauled away as construction began on the replacement.

The newly completed bridge is designed by architect Michael Maltzan and the HNTB Design-Build team and contractors Skanska and Stacy and Witbeck. The new design has several green spaces built under and around it. Bridge construction has experienced several years-long construction delays and multimillion-dollar cost increases.  When opened, the new span included single-direction bicycle lanes separated from motor traffic with rubber curb bumps and impact-forgiving bollards, a design feature that was universally panned as unsafe and dangerous to cyclists using the bridge.  A need for emergency vehicle access was given as justification for this design decision by officials, however this has been challenged by advocacy groups and community members. The bridge opened on July 9, 2022.

Cultural depictions

The former bridge was a well-known local landmark, and was iconic due to appearing in numerous films, television shows, music videos and video games since 1932.

Films

 I Am a Fugitive from a Chain Gang (1932)
 Them! (1954)
 Hot Rod Girl (1956)
 Point Blank (1967)
 That Man Bolt (1973)
 Freaky Friday (1976)
 Grease (1978)
 Blue Thunder (1983)
 Repo Man (1984)
 Savage Streets (1984)
 To Live and Die in L.A. (1985)
 The Crow: City of Angels (1996) 
 Armed and Dangerous (1986)
 They Live (1988)
 Colors (1988)
 The Naked Gun: From the Files of Police Squad! (1988)
 Tapeheads (1988)
 Terminator 2: Judgment Day (1991)
 Blood In Blood Out (1993)
 The Mask (1994)
 My Family (1995)
 Playing God (1997)
 Blade (1998)
 Gone in 60 Seconds (2000)
 Swordfish (2001)
 Biker Boyz (2003)
 The Core (2003)
 National Security (2003)
 Terminator 3: Rise of the Machines (2003)
 S.W.A.T. (2003)
 Anchorman: The Legend of Ron Burgundy (2004)
 Be Cool (2005)
 Dirty (2005)
 Transformers (2007)
 Drive (2011)
 Horrible Bosses (2011)
 In Time (2011)
 Zombie Apocalypse (2011)
 The Dark Knight Rises (2012)
 Stand Up Guys (2012)
 The Purge: Anarchy (2014)
 Knight of Cups (2015)
 Furious 7 (2015)
 Lowriders (2016)
 The Bad Guys (2022)

Music videos

 The Psycho Realm video for "Stone Garden"
 Good Charlotte video for The River
 Madonna videos for "What It Feels Like for a Girl" and "Borderline"
 Transplants video for Gangsters and Thugs single
 Transplants video for "What I Can't Describe"
 System of a Down video for Lonely Day single
 INXS video for Afterglow
 The Pussycat Dolls video for Don't Cha
 Pussycat Dolls video for Stickwitu
 Blink-182 video for Down
 Kanye West video for Jesus Walks
 Kid Rock video for American Bad Ass
 Ne-Yo video for Beautiful Monster
 Future video for "Shit"
 Avril Lavigne video for What the Hell
 Avril Lavigne video for I'm With You (song)
 The Calling video for Wherever You Will Go
 Thirty Seconds to Mars video for Kings and Queens
 Tyga video for "Reminded"
 Foo Fighters video for "Walk"
 Usher video for My Way
 Bruno Mars video for Grenade
 Christina Milian video for "Say I"
 Ray J video for "What I Need"
 Chris Brown video for Deuces
 Far East Movement video for "Rocketeer"
 The D.O.C video for "It's Funky Enough"
 Limp Bizkit video for "Gold Cobra"
 Jimmy Ray video for "Are you Jimmy Ray "
 Maroon 5 videos for "Payphone" and "Wake Up Call"
 Chicago video for "Stay the Night" (1986)
 Amy Grant video for "Baby Baby" (1991)
 Vanessa Carlton video for "A Thousand Miles" (2002)
 Pixie Lott video for "All About Tonight" (2011)
 Everlast video for "Long At All" (2012)
 Conor Maynard video for "Turn Around" (2012)
 Cheryl Cole video for "Call My Name" (2012)
 Zedd video for "Clarity" (2012)
 The Lonely Island video for "Yolo" (2013)
 Pharrell Williams video for "Happy" (Despicable Me 2) (2013)
 Calvin Harris and Alesso featuring Hurts video for "Under Control" (2013)
 Galantis video for "You"
 Paolo Nutini video for "Scream (Funk My Life Up)"
 London Grammar video for "Strong" (2013)
 The Summer Set video for "Maybe Tonight" (2013)
 Hilary Duff video for "All About You" (2015)
 Monsta X video for "Rush" (2015)
 Jedward video for "Good Vibes" (2016)
 Taemin video for "Press Your Number_Performance Video Ver.1" (2016)
 Red Hot Chili Peppers video for "Dark Necessities" (2016)
 Beck video for "Wow" (2017)
 Kendrick Lamar video for "HUMBLE." (2017)
 Loona Odd Eye Circle video for "Girl Front" (2017)
 Beastie Boys video for Sabotage (1994)
 Backstreet Boys video for "Straight Through My Heart" (2009)
 T.I video for "Live Your Life" (2008)
 Rudimental video for "Waiting All Night"

Television

 St. Elsewhere – Season 3, Episode 1 "Playing God" (1984)
 Remington Steele – Season 2, Episode 15 "Elegy in Steele" (1984)
 Cagney & Lacey – Season 4, Episode 2 "Heat" (1984)
 L.A. Heat – Season 2, Episode "Little Saigon" (1999)
 Columbo – Season  13, Episode 5 " Columbo Likes the Nightlife" (2003)
 24 – Season 3, Episode 22 (2004) & Season 8, Episode 8 (2010)
 Lost – Season 3, Episodes 22 and 23 "Through the Looking Glass" (2007)
 Terminator: The Sarah Connor Chronicles – Season 2, Episode 1 "Samson and Delilah" (2008)
 The Amazing Race – Season 15, Episode 1 "They Thought Godzilla Was Walking Down the Street" (2009)
 Melrose Place – Pilot (2009)
 Bosch – Season 1, Chapter Four: Fugazi (2015)
 Fear the Walking Dead – Pilot (2015)
 Stitchers – Season 2, Episode 3 "The One That Got Away" (2016)
 BoJack Horseman – Season 5, Episode 9 "Ancient History" (2018)
 On Cinema –  "Decker" (2019)

Video games
 Grand Theft Auto: San Andreas
 L.A. Noire
 Transformers: Revenge of the Fallen
 Grand Theft Auto V
 Midnight Club: Los Angeles
 Split/Second

See also
List of bridges documented by the Historic American Engineering Record in California

References

External links
Historical Marker Database website
Sixth Street Viaduct Replacement Project website

1932 establishments in California
2016 disestablishments in California
Through arch bridges in the United States
Boyle Heights, Los Angeles
Bridges completed in 1932
Bridges in Los Angeles County, California
Buildings and structures demolished in 2016
Buildings and structures in Downtown Los Angeles
Concrete bridges in California
Demolished bridges in the United States
Demolished buildings and structures in Los Angeles
Former road bridges in the United States
Historic American Engineering Record in California
Los Angeles River
Road bridges in California